José E. Meléndez-Pérez (born January 2, 1946) is a Puerto Rican-born United States Immigration and Naturalization Service Inspector at Orlando International Airport who became a key figure for the 9/11 Commission when he refused entry to an alleged terrorist prior to the September 11, 2001 attacks.

Personal life
José Meléndez-Pérez is one of three sons born to chauffeur, Nicolas Meléndez (1912–1998) and women's nightwear factory maker, Francisca Pérez (born 1924). He has six half-siblings (three half-brothers and three half-sisters) from his father's other relationships. His parents divorced in 1975 after 30 years of marriage. He married twice and has five children, Freddy, Maribel, Brenda, Jose Jr. and Nelson. One of Meléndez-Pérez sons, José Jr. is a Directorate Sergeant Major in the U.S. Army Rangers since August 1996 and served in War in Afghanistan and Iraq War with the 319th Field Artillery Regiment of the 82nd Airborne Division. His other son, Nelson, is a police officer with the Puerto Rico Police. One of his daughters, Brenda, is married to an U.S. Immigration and Customs Enforcement officer serving in the U.S. Embassy in Frankfurt, Germany.

Career
Meléndez-Pérez's story is told in the book Instinct by Michael Smerconish (Lyons Press, September 2009), as well as Glenn Beck's Miracles and Massacres (Threshold Editions/Mercury Radio Arts, 2013). Prior to the formation of the Department of Homeland Security, he was employed by the U.S. Immigration and Naturalization Service (INS) from November 15, 1992, to April 30, 2003.

He joined the United States Army, where he served honorably for over 26.5 years (1965-1992). He served two tours of duty in the Vietnam War, 1965–1966 and 1969–1970. He was later assigned as a first sergeant to the United States Army Recruiting Command.

After retiring from the U.S. Army, he began his career with INS in November 1992 at Miami International Airport as an inspector, and later as an inspector at Orlando International Airport. He was assigned for six months at the Federal Law Enforcement Training Center in Glynco, Georgia, providing assistance to the firearms program.

Actions on August 4, 2001
A Saudi Arabian national, Mohammed al Qahtani, landed in Orlando on a Virgin Atlantic flight. Since Qahtani's forms were not properly filled out, he was moved to a secondary interview, conducted by Meléndez-Pérez. Qahtani did not have a return ticket or a hotel. He had $2,800 in cash and no credit cards. Questions to where he would stay and where he would go were evasive. Besides being quite hostile, Qahtani also made contradictory statements regarding his plans.

Meléndez-Pérez advised his superiors to have him sent back. According to Meléndez-Pérez's testimony, he sent Qahtani back out of the United States, the man allegedly turned around to him and said "something to the effect of 'I'll be back.'"

See also
Samuel J. Heyman Service to America Medals (2004 Finalist)

References

External links
 2004 Samuel J Heyman Service to America Medal Finalist honoree profile from the Partnership for Public Service website
 Official Testimony of Jose Melendez-Perez to the 9/11 Commission

Living people
United States Army non-commissioned officers
United States Army personnel of the Vietnam War
People from Arroyo, Puerto Rico
Puerto Rican law enforcement personnel
Puerto Rican Army personnel
United States Army soldiers
1946 births